St. Pius X High School was founded in 1959 to provide a Catholic education for high school students in Jefferson County, Missouri, United States. The only Catholic high school in Jefferson County, St. Pius X is part of the  Roman Catholic Archdiocese of Saint Louis.

Description

The course catalog includes courses in digital citizenship, forensic science and a wellness program. 35 hours of college credit dual-enrollment coursework is available through Saint Louis University and the University of Missouri - St. Louis. 102 hours of community service are part of the graduation requirements for each student, along with a capstone project requirement implemented for the class of 2021 and beyond. St. Pius X principal Karen DeCosty is an alumnus of the school, graduating in 1993.

Sports and Activities
St. Pius X offers the following MSHAA sports and activities:

 Baseball
 Men's and Women's Basketball
 Cheerleading
 Men's and Women's Cross Country (girls took 3rd in the state championship as a team and one girl was state champion in 2020)
 Football
 Men's and Women's Golf
 Lancer Dancers
 Men's and Women's Soccer (girls have won 1 state championship)
 Softball
 Men's and Women's Tennis
 Men's and Women's Track & Field
 Women's Volleyball (team has won three state championships, most recently 2017)
 Weightlifting
 Women's Lacrosse
 Theater, Speech and Debate

Notable alumni

Mike Henneman, Class of 1980 - former MLB player
Steve Stoll, Class of 1965 - former Democratic Missouri State Senator and Congressional candidate
Paul Wieland, Class of 1981 - Missouri state senator representing the 22nd District
Jennifer Johnson Cano, Class of 2002 - American operatic mezzo-soprano

References

High schools in Jefferson County, Missouri
Private schools in Greater St. Louis
Roman Catholic secondary schools in Greater St. Louis
Educational institutions established in 1959
Roman Catholic Archdiocese of St. Louis
1959 establishments in Missouri
Education in Jefferson County, Missouri